Amanda Lindsay Overmyer (born October 26, 1984) is an American rock singer-songwriter who was the eleventh place finalist on the seventh season of American Idol.

Biography
Overmyer grew up in Camden, Indiana, and attended Delphi Community High School in Delphi, Indiana. She began singing in bands as a teenager, and followed the styles of Southern rock musicians that her dad listened to, like Bob Seger, Kansas, Lynyrd Skynyrd, and Led Zeppelin. She often played at biker rallies.

She eventually left music, and earned nursing degree from Ivy Tech Community College and started to work in healthcare.

American Idol

Overview
She tried out for American Idol to give music one more try. She became known as the "biker chick" and her sound was compared to Janis Joplin. Overmyer was eliminated on the March 19, 2008, episode of American Idol, putting her in 11th place.

The American Idol judges have often compared her sound to Janis Joplin. Overmyer was eliminated on the March 19, 2008, episode of American Idol, putting her in 11th place and just missing out on the tour.

After her ouster on the April 23, 2008, episode, fellow finalist Carly Smithson stated in her post-exit interviews that Amanda Overmyer had been her favorite singer of the competition.

Overmyer is currently the only contestant from Indiana to become a finalist in American Idol history.

Performances

Post-Idol
After her elimination from American Idol, Overmyer made appearances on The Ellen DeGeneres Show, Live with Regis and Kelly, and The Morning Show with Mike and Juliet.

On May 24, 2008, Overmyer headlined the Women of Rock show at the Whisky a Go Go in West Hollywood, California.

On December 10, 2008, Overmyer released her debut album "Solidify". "Play On" was the debut single from the album and is dedicated to her husband.

Her biggest show was in her hometown of Lafayette, Indiana during the summer of 2009, where nearly 14,000 fans came out and watched her perform with her band.  In 2009, her band went through a lineup change, and Overmyer auditioned a session guitarist from Purdue University.

Overmyer and her band have toured extensively, chiefly in the midwest, since her appearance on Idol through 2014. She announced on YouTube in November 2013 that, in addition to future live shows, she will be writing new music for an upcoming album.

Discography

Albums

Track listing
 "Fail to Compromise"
 "Love Me Like You Want"
 "Hole in the Wall"
 "Play On"
 "Call Your Mama"
 "Fight Like a Son"
 "Lay It Down"
 "Varmint Rifle"
 "Iroquois Lane"
 "A Long Time"
 "Let's Take It Outside"
 "Pray"

Singles
"Play On" (2008)
"Love Me Like You Want"  (2009)

References

External links
 Official website
 Official American Idol profile

1984 births
Living people
21st-century American singers
American women rock singers
Singers from Indiana
Musicians from Little Rock, Arkansas
American Idol participants
People from Delphi, Indiana
People from Carroll County, Indiana
Singers from Arkansas
21st-century American women singers